Serco Marine Services is a Private Finance Initiative contract, with Serco Group, to deliver auxiliary services to His Majesty's Naval Service (incl. Royal Navy, Royal Marines and Royal Fleet Auxiliary). 

Marine Services primarily operates from the nation's three main naval bases, HMNB Portsmouth, HMNB Devonport and HMNB Clyde, but also supports training and operations overseas, as well as at various British Overseas Territories. 

Serco Denholm (a joint venture between Serco Group and Denholm Group) 
won the Marine Services contract, replacing the subsequently disbanded Royal Maritime Auxiliary Service. Denholm's participation was bought out in late 2009 by its larger partner, Serco.

History

In 1976, the former Admiralty Yard Craft Service merged with the Royal Maritime Auxiliary Service to provide Marine Services for the United Kingdoms Naval Service. However, by 1996 Marine Services was put out to commercial tender by the Ministry of Defence Warship Support Agency (now part of the Defence Equipment and Support organisation) which resulted in all tugs, lifting craft and various tenders being operated by Serco Denholm (the joint venture between Serco Group and Denholm Group). The commercial tender awarded to Serco Denholm also included the  management of naval bases Devonport, Portsmouth and Clyde. At the time of the International Festival of the Sea in 2005, Serco Denholm were operating over 120 vessels in support of the Naval Service, including tugs, passenger vessels, pilot boats and a range of stores and tank-cleaning lighters. Although Serco Denholm operated and provided all auxiliaries, it did so under the then Royal Maritime Auxiliary Service.

In 2006, the MoD awarded the "Future Provision of Marine Services" contract (a Private Finance Initiative) to the preferred bidders, Serco Denholm. In December 2007, Serco began the flagship £1bn Private Finance Initiative to provide marine services to the Royal Navy for the next 15 years. This contract includes the manning, operation and maintenance of over one hundred vessels and the introduction of around thirty new ones. As a direct result of this, the Royal Maritime Auxiliary Service which had previously provided this role was formally disbanded on 31 March 2008. All vessels formally prefixed RMAS assumed the SD prefix instead.

In 2009, Serco (being the larger partner in the joint venture with Denholm) bought out Denholm's share. Since then, all vessels have seen the SD funnel logos replaced with the Serco logo on the vessels superstructure. However the SD prefix has been retained. The service is now known as Serco Marine Services.

Role
Serco Marine Services supports the Naval Service and the Royal Fleet Auxiliary in both port and deep water operations. In port and UK waters, Marine Services is primarily tasked with berthing and towage activities located at the three main naval bases; Devonport, Portsmouth and Clyde. Other tasks such as coastal logistics (including stores, liquids and munitions) and passenger ferrying is also readily undertaken. Out-of-port operations in UK waters include direct involvement in supporting diving and minelaying training exercises, as well as torpedo recovery.

Overseas, Serco Marine Services undertake similar activities in locations such as Gibraltar, the Falklands, and the Sovereign Base Areas of Akrotiri and Dhekelia in Cyprus, which includes the maintenance of navigational marks (or buoys) and supporting military operations and training.

Ships

As of 2014, there are over 100 vessels operated by Serco Marine Services. Since the disbandment of the Royal Maritime Auxiliary Service, all vessels carry the ship prefix SD, and continue to do so since Denholm's share was bought out by Serco in late 2009. Vessels currently in service can be recognised by their black hulls with white beading and white-coloured upperworks. The former buff-coloured upperworks which had once been associated with the RMAS are steadily disappearing with the last few vessels due to adopt the new colour scheme in coming years.  Marine Services enables Royal Navy and Royal Fleet Auxiliary ships, including the United Kingdoms Strategic Nuclear Deterrent, to either move in or out of port for operational deployment and training exercises around the world. The service operates a large assortment of auxiliaries including tugs and pilot boats as well as transporting stores, liquid and munitions and providing passenger transfer services to and from ships for officers and crew.

All ships of Serco Marine Services fly the Red Ensign.

The largest ship currently in service is SD Northern River.

See also
His Majesty's Naval Service
Royal Navy
Royal Marines
Royal Fleet Auxiliary

References

External links

Serco